Stenygra angustata is a species of beetle in the family Cerambycidae. It was described by Olivier in 1790.

References

Hexoplonini
Beetles described in 1790